Red Bush is an unincorporated community in Anderson Township, Warrick County, in the U.S. state of Indiana.

History
A post office was established at Red Bush in 1871, and remained in operation until it was discontinued in 1875.

Geography

References

Unincorporated communities in Warrick County, Indiana
Unincorporated communities in Indiana